Ignace Xavier Joseph Leybach (17 July 1817 – 23 May 1891) was a French pianist, organist, music educator and a composer of salon piano music.

Career
Born in Gambsheim, Alsace, Leybach had his early training as an organist with Joseph Wackenthaler (1795–1869), the organist and maître de chapelle of the Strasbourg Cathedral, and then was a pupil in Paris of Friedrich Kalkbrenner and of Chopin. He was a famous pianist in his time, but is largely remembered for a single piece, his Fifth Nocturne, Op. 52, for solo piano; it is still in print. His Fantaisie élégante uses familiar themes from Gounod's Faust.

From 1844 he was organist at the cathédrale Saint-Étienne, Toulouse, succeeding Justin Cadaux. He published a three-volume method for the organ for which he also wrote about 350 pieces. Leybach also wrote motets and liturgical music.

Leybach died in Toulouse.

References
Oscar Thompson Cyclopedia of Music and Musicians, 1949:  Ignace Leybach
"Théophile Gautier, sa famille et la musique" note 18.

External links
 

1817 births
1891 deaths
19th-century classical composers
19th-century French male classical pianists
19th-century French composers
Cathedral organists
Classical composers of church music
Composers for piano
Composers for pipe organ
French classical organists
French male classical composers
French music educators
French Romantic composers
French male organists
People from Bas-Rhin
Piano pedagogues
Male classical organists
19th-century organists